Palaedaphus is an extinct genus of prehistoric bony fish.

See also

 Prehistoric fish
 List of prehistoric bony fish

References

External links
 Bony fish in the online Sepkoski Database

Prehistoric bony fish genera